The 2007 British Athletics Championships was the national championship in outdoor track and field for athletes in the United Kingdom, held from 27 to 29 July at Manchester Regional Arena in Manchester. It was first time that the event was organised by UK Athletics and it incorporated the AAA Championships (the principal national competition organised separately by the Amateur Athletic Association of England until 2006). The national championships served as a selection meeting for Great Britain at the 2007 World Championships in Athletics.

Results

Men

Women

References 

Norwich Union World Trials & AAA Championships. Power of 10. Retrieved 2020-02-02.
2007 British Athletics Championships . UK Athletics. Retrieved 2020-02-02.

External links
British Athletics website

British Outdoor Championships
British Athletics Championships
Athletics Outdoor
British Athletics Championships
Sports competitions in Manchester
2000s in Manchester